So Young is a 2013 Chinese drama film directed by Zhao Wei. It is based on the best-selling novel of the same name To Our Youth that is Fading Away by Xin Yiwu. The film is Zhao's directorial debut.

The film's English-language title alludes to the song "So Young" by the British alternative rock band Suede from their self-titled debut album. In addition to the novel, the film was also based in part by Zhao's own personal college experience in the 1990s.

The film has become a major success at the Chinese box office, grossing over US$118 million with a US$5 million budget.

Plot
Zheng Wei starts college as a civil engineering major to be in the same city as her childhood playmate, Lin Jing, whom she is determined to marry one day. When Wei visits Jing at his dormitory, however, she is told that Jing left for America. Unable to understand why Jing left so abruptly, Wei is confused and heartbroken. Back in her own dormitory, Wei becomes close friends with her three roommates: Ruan Guan, the most beautiful and popular girl in the class; Li Weijuan, a realistic girl who comes from a poor town but is determined to marry well; and Zhu Xiaobei, a tomboy. The four girls talk about their goals in life and all cheer to Ruan Guan's ambition—to have a youth that never fades away.

Wei is befriended by architecture majors Lao Zhang and his roommate Xu Kaiyang. Kaiyang comes from a well-to-do family and pursues Wei romantically, but Wei only regards him as a friend. One evening Wei goes to Lao Zhang and Kaiyang's dorm room to borrow a DVD. Wei is disgusted by the messy condition of the male dorm room, except for one bed that is neat and clean, which Lao Zhang says belongs to their roommate Chen Xiaozheng. Wei sees a building model on the table and fumbles with the parts. At this moment Xiaozheng comes back and yells out, "What are you doing?" Startled, Wei knocks the model off the table. Xiaozheng manages to save his model by shoving Wei out of the way, who falls in a mess on the floor.

Enraged in humiliation, Wei angrily demands an apology from Xiaozheng, but Xiaozheng coolly replies that he has nothing to apologize for and that it was her fault for touching his model. From this moment, Wei is determined to repeatedly humiliate and pester Xiaozheng until she gets her apology. Through her attempts, Wei comes to the realization that she likes Xiaozheng. From Lao Zhang and Weijuan, Wei learns that Xiaozheng comes from a poor family and was raised by a strict mother, hence his disciplined personality. Wei declares her interest in Xiaozheng, and then relentlessly stalks Xiaozheng to get his attention, much to his annoyance. Eventually, Xiaozheng finds himself to like Wei too, and the two start dating.

During the rest of their college life and relationship, Xiaozheng and Wei find that they have starkly contrasting personalities. Although he appreciates Wei's enthusiastic personality, Xiaozheng also reprimands Wei at times for her laid-back and undisciplined attitude towards her coursework. Wei asks Xiaozheng why he is always so serious about everything. Xiaozheng replies, "My life is like a building that can only be built once, so I cannot afford any margin of error, not even a centimeter's width." Due to his family's modest financial circumstances, Xiaozheng feels that he needed to do everything he can to ensure the best possible professional future for himself.

Eventually graduation comes upon Wei and Xiaozheng. At the on-campus recruitment and interview fair, Wei hopes she and Xiaozheng can work at the same company and thus remain together. Unbeknownst to Wei, Xiaozheng had applied to and obtained a graduate fellowship to study architecture in America. When Wei finally learns of his plan, she confronts Xiaozheng to ask why she was the last one to know. Xiaozheng explains that he could not tell her because he was afraid of hurting her and reiterates that he could not make any mistake in his life, so he had to make the choice to leave her to make a better future for himself.

A few years later, Wei has become a mature professional who excels in her work, much different from her bygone youthful days. One day she suddenly encounters Lin Jing. Jing explains that he left abruptly then because he learned his father was having an affair with Wei's mother, so he could not face Wei. He never went to America, but avoided contact with Wei. The one time when he saw Wei on at her campus, she was happy with Xiaozheng. Now, however, he wants to come back and rekindle their friendship and romance. At the same time, Xiaozheng has also returned from America as an accomplished architect. Though he has everything professionally that he was determined to get, Xiaozheng finds his life to be empty. He deeply regrets letting go of Wei, realizing that his time with her was the only time he could be his true self, and thus he also wants to rekindle their relationship. However, Wei on their first meeting firmly rejects Xiaocheng. Not long afterward, Ruan Guan is killed in a car accident when trying to meet her university boyfriend one last time before she marries another man. Wei, in grief, asks Lin Jing to marry her. However, she later calls it off when Lin Jing tells Wei about another girl that loved him during their time apart. Afterwards, Xiaocheng and Wei meet once more at the aquarium to reminisce. There Xiaozheng asks Wei, "Can I start over, and love you again?" to which Wei replies, "Xiaozheng, we spent our youth together, we owe each other nothing... youth is something you can only relive in memory."

Cast
Yang Zishan as Zheng Wei
Mark Chao as Chen Xiaozheng
Han Geng as Lin Jing
Jiang Shuying as Ruan Guan
Bao Bei'er as Zhang
Zheng Kai as Xu Kaiyang
Zhang Yao as Li Weijuan
Tong Liya as Shi Jie
Cya Liu as Zhu Xiaobei
Wang Jiajia as Zeng Shu
Huang Ming as Zhao Shiyong
Pan Hong as Chen's mother
Yang Lan as Yang Lan
Han Hong as DJ Zi Juan
Wang Sen as Wang Yaming

Casting
Xin Yiwu, author of the novel, has mentioned that Zhao Wei was actually her choice to play the lead character of "Zheng Wei". However, Zhao declined the offer, and opted to direct the film.

Besides Mark Chao and Han Geng, a majority of the cast are newcomers, including Yang Zishan, who played the story's protagonist Zheng Wei. Zhao stated, "They're very green and new. Sometimes they even lack common sense. But I like working with them because they're down-to-earth...What they lack in experience, they replace with enthusiasm."

Production
For this film, Zhao Wei intended to take the story in a panorama view to the life of college students in the 1990s, "not just a love triangle", "I'd like to devote this film to everyone out there who had a similar youth... It's a memory shared by those who were born on the Chinese Mainland between the 1970s and early 80s."  Zhao also bought the rights to Suede's song for the film.

Production on the film started from March 3 and ended on June 22, 2012.

Soundtrack
Theme song: "To Youth"
Composer: Dou Peng
Lyricist: Li Qiang
Performer: Faye Wong

Reception

Critical response
After the premiere of the film in Beijing, it has gained favorable reviews from critics and audience, and has been dubbed a "mature directorial debut".

It has also gained positive reviews from English-language critics. Dereke Elley of Film Business Asia gave the film a 7 out of 10,  describes the film as "an impressive directorial debut" and praised the film's "powerhouse first 90 minutes" as "that draw an involving portrait of love, friendship, ambition and broken dreams among a group of university students..." However, Elley criticized the last portion of the film, and states "as the film abruptly flashes forward several years to pick up the characters in the big city, all the dramatic credit accumulated to that point is squandered by a final 40 minutes that seem rushed and fabricated, with none of the earlier dramatic traction."  Elley summoned up "As a two-part movie running some three hours, So Young could have been a truly epic portrait of youthful emotional errors and their later consequences. As it stands, it's a remarkable directorial debut by Zhao that's well acted by its ensemble cast but is more of an ambitious, great-looking torso than a single movie." Elley also states "One can only hope that one day an extended Director's Cut of the film will eventually emerge on ancillary."

Maggie Lee of Variety described the film as an "accomplished directing debut" and "a lyrical ode to youth at its most fearless and foolhardy." Elizabeth Kerr of The Hollywood Reporter wrote "Anchored by an engaging performance by Yang Zishan in her first lead role, Zhao's film proves the actress turned director adept with images and actors... The film's first 90 minutes make for a complete enough film that the bloated, soapy final 40 become a distraction from Zhao and Li's careful character construction earlier on. It's been rumored that Zhao's original cut clocked in at three hours, and so in that light the rushed, half-baked feel of the last act becomes clear. But even with more time the "adult" segment of the film feels out of place, tonally and stylistically. Thankfully Zhao makes the most of her cast, who carry the film farther than it has a right to go."  Tay Huizhen of MovieXclusive (Singapore) gave the film a rating of 4.5/5.

Top Ten Lists
10th - Lie Fu, Asia Weekly
10th - Popular Cinema Magazine
10th - Mainland/Taiwan/Hong Kong Film Poll (Organized by Taiwan Film Board and China Film Critics Society)
10th - Hong Kong Film Critics Association
8th - Taiwan Film Critics Society
Mainland Film of the Year - Southern Weekly

Box Office
In mainland China, the film grossed 45 million yuan in the opening-day, and broke the opening-day box office record for a non-3D Chinese language film.  The film also surpassed Journey to the West: Conquering the Demons in advanced sales according to online box office tabulation. The film went on to gross 141 million yuan in its opening weekend, and Zhao became the first Chinese female director to have a first feature film to gross over the 100 million yuan mark. Through May 5, its cume was $76.72M. In an interview, Zhao Wei said "I'm given box office figures every other day. I feel OK. I am very satisfied with what we've taken. You can't be too greedy."

Accolades

References

External links
Official Micro-blog

2013 directorial debut films
Films based on Chinese novels
Chinese romantic drama films
Chinese coming-of-age films
2013 romantic drama films
2013 films
Beijing Enlight Pictures films
Universities and colleges in art
Films with screenplays by Li Qiang
Chinese teen films
2010s Mandarin-language films